Term (also known as Term Şaḩrā) is a village in Kolijan Rostaq-e Sofla Rural District, in the Central District of Sari County, Mazandaran Province, Iran. At the 2006 census, its population was 420, in 101 families.

References 

Populated places in Sari County